"Toi + Moi" is a 2008 pop song recorded by French singer Grégoire. It was his debut single off his album of the same name and was released in October 2008. It achieved huge success in francophone countries.

Background and release
As the song was produced by 347 Internet users, Grégoire allowed forty of them to appear elsewhere in the music video performing the song in playback. This 3:02 video is available on the DVD of the collector edition. As sign of popularity, the song and the music video were included on the famous double compilation NRJ Music Awards 2009.

The song was quickly aired by the radio NRJ and RTL. With this song, Grégoire was nominated at the 2008 NRJ Music Awards in the category 'French revelation of the year' and performed it on the show in a new version with Sheryfa Luna, Shy'm, Zaho, Natasha St-Pier, Sofia Essaïdi, Nâdiya et Louisy Joseph. "Toi + Moi" was thus included on the NRJ Music Awards 2009 compilation.

In 2009, the song was covered by Maurane, Maxime Le Forestier, Claire Keim, Gérard Darmon, Julie Zenatti, Gérald De Palmas, Liane Foly and Nolwenn Leroy for Les Enfoirés' album Les Enfoirés font leur cinéma. This cover version was ranked number 16 on the Belgian Ultratop 50 Singles Chart on 28 March 2009.

Toi + Moi was also used as the theme song for the 2012 edition of the Québécois musical reality series, Star Académie, sung by the contestants.

Chart performances
"Toi + Moi" was a smash hit, peaking at number-one on the French Digital chart for six non-consecutive weeks from 27 September 2008, and eventually became the most downloaded single of the year in France. It was also much aired on radio, peaking at number two on 24 October 2008.

The song was also a number-one hit single and on the Belgian (Wallonia) Singles Chart, debuting at number one on 8 November and staying atop for twelve consecutive weeks. It totaled 35 weeks in the top 40 (Ultratop 50). The song was also a top ten hit in Switzerland and remained for 26 weeks in the top 100.

Credits
 Written by Grégoire
 Vocals by Grégoire
 Arranged by Franck Authié and Grégoire
 Guitar by Franck Authié
 Mastered by Greg Calbi
 Piano by Cyril Taïeb
 Recorded by Franck Authié and Ken Ploquin
 Produced by Franck Authié

Charts

Peak positions

Year-end charts

References

External links
 "Toi + Moi", official music video

Grégoire (musician) songs
2008 debut singles
Ultratop 50 Singles (Wallonia) number-one singles
Songs written by Grégoire (musician)
2008 songs